Olave may refer to:

an alternate form of the Scandinavian name Olaf
Gonzalo Olave (1983-2009), Chilean actor
Jámison Olave (born 1981), Colombian footballer
Juan Carlos Olave (born 1976), Argentine footballer

See also
 Olaf (disambiguation)